Cottonwood Spring may refer to:

 Cottonwood Spring (Black Mountains, Nevada)
 Cottonwood Spring (Blue Diamond, Nevada)